The New York Women's Foundation (NYWF) is a 501c3 charitable organization in New York City that works to bring economic security, end gender-based violence, and provide health access and reproductive justice to all women and girls.  It describes itself as a "cross-cultural alliance that ignites action and invests in bold, community-led solutions across the city."

It was established in 1987.  It was co-founded by  Gloria W. Milliken and Helen LaKelly Hunt.  By 2007, it was giving away a million dollars a year. In 2008, it was slated to give away $2.75 million. In 2011, Ana Oliveira was president of the New York Women’s Foundation.  In February 2013 it received a grant of $750,000 from Walmart.  In April 2013, it released a report that found that women in New York are 30% more likely to die in childbirth than they were 12 years  prior. 

In 2018, The Foundation announced the launch of the Fund to Support the Me Too Movement in partnership with Me Too Movement Founder and Leader Tarana Burke with an initial $1 million in seed funding. In October 2018, the Fund gave out its first round of grants to eight organizations across the nation that are working to end gender-based violence and help survivors of sexual violence heal and find their strength as leaders. The groups, chosen in consultation with #MeToo founder Tarana Burke, are focused on marginalized and underserved communities, including immigrant communities and communities of color as well as LGBTQ people.

References

External links
Official homepage
Charity Navigator entry
The New York Women's Foundation Presents Celebrating Women, a Benefit and 1990 Grants Breakfast, The New York Women's Foundation, 1990

Charities based in New York City
Organizations established in 1987
Women's health
Women's empowerment
Women in New York (state)
Women in New York City